Mubarkpur is a village in Shaheed Bhagat Singh Nagar district of Punjab State, India. The village is administrated by Sarpanch an elected representative of the village.

Demography 
As of 2011, Mubarkpur has a total number of 356 houses and a population of 1747, of which 894 are males while 853 are females, according to the report published by Census India in 2011. The literacy rate of Mubarkpur is 80.20% higher than the state average of 75.84%. The population of children under the age of 6 years is 186 which is 10.65% of total population of Mubarkpur, and child sex ratio is approximately 806 as compared to Punjab state average of 846.

Most of the people are from Schedule Caste which constitutes 60.79% of total population in Mubarkpur. The town does not have any Schedule Tribe population so far.

As per the report published by Census India in 2011, 504 people were engaged in work activities out of the total population of Mubarkpur which includes 482 males and 22 females. According to census survey report 2011, 97.82% workers describe their work as main work and 2.18% workers are involved in Marginal activity providing livelihood for less than 6 months.

Education 
KC Engineering College and Doaba Khalsa Trust Group Of Institutions are the nearest colleges.

List of schools nearby:
Dashmesh Model School, Kahma
Govt Primary School, Kahlon
Govt High School, Garcha

Transport 

See also 
List of villages in India

References

External links 
 Tourism of Punjab
 Census of Punjab
 Locality Based PINCode

Villages in Shaheed Bhagat Singh Nagar district